The list of riots in Singapore is a list of riots which happened in Singapore.

Singapore in Straits Settlements 
Singapore in Straits Settlements (1826-1946)
 15 – 20 February 1851 - Anti-Catholic riots (1851) Anti-Teochew Catholic riots (500 dead (Teochews))
5 – 17 May 1854 - Hokkien-Teochew riots (200-480 dead, 222 injured)
15 December 1876 - Chinese Post Office Riots
12 March 1927 -

Colony of Singapore 
Colony of Singapore (1946-1963)
11 December 1950 - Maria Hertogh riots (18 dead, 173 injured)
13 May 1954 - 1954 National Service riots (26 injured)
12 May 1955 - Hock Lee bus riots (4 dead, 31 injured)
26 October 1956 - Chinese middle schools riots (13 dead, more than 100 injured)
22 April 1963 - City Hall riot

Singapore in Malaysia 
Singapore in Malaysia (1963-1965)
12 July 1963 - Pulau Senang prison riot (4 dead, 5 injured)
21 July 1964 - 1964 race riots (36 dead, 560 injured)

Singapore 
Singapore (1965-present)
31 May – 6 June 1969 - 1969 race riots (4 dead, 80 injured)
8 December 2013 - 2013 Little India riot (62 injured)

References

Riots and civil disorder in Singapore
Singapore
Riots